Pontibacter populi  is a Gram-negative, rod-shaped and non-motile bacterium from the genus of Pontibacter which has been isolated from soil from a Populus euphratica forest in Xinjiang in China.

References

External links
Type strain of Pontibacter populi at BacDive -  the Bacterial Diversity Metadatabase

Cytophagia
Bacteria described in 2012